Something Always Happens may refer to:
 Something Always Happens (1934 film), a British romantic comedy film
 Something Always Happens (1928 film), an American silent horror film